Kim In-kwon (born January 20, 1978) is a South Korean actor. Known for playing memorable supporting characters, he starred in his first leading role in the sleeper hit He's on Duty (2010), followed by Almost Che (2012), Born to Sing (2013), and Apostle (2014).

Kim also directed and starred in the 2002 short film Shivski.

Filmography

Film

Television series

Variety show

Theater

Awards and nominations

References

External links
Kim In-kwon at YNK Entertainment 
 Kim In-kwon Fan Cafe at Daum
 
 
 

Male actors from Busan
South Korean male film actors
South Korean male television actors
1978 births
Living people
Dongguk University alumni
21st-century South Korean male actors